Haselrig is a surname. Notable people with the surname include:

Arthur Haselrig (1601–1661), English politician
Carlton Haselrig (1966–2020), American heavyweight wrestler and NFL player